Bob Daniels is an American ice hockey coach, currently in charge at Ferris State, a position he has held since 1992.

Career
Daniels began his coaching career shortly after graduating from Michigan State with a BA in accounting, becoming the head coach for the Hennessey Engineers of the Great Lakes Junior Hockey League. After three seasons in Plymouth, Michigan, Daniels returned to college, this time attending Miami University and earning a Master's in sports organization while serving as a graduate assistant for the RedHawks in 1986–87. The next season saw Daniels as a full-time college assistant for Illinois-Chicago and in his second season the Flames saw their best performance, finishing 3rd in the CCHA and advancing out of the first round in the conference tournament for the first time. After the two-year stint Daniels moved back to Michigan, becoming an assistant at Ferris State under John Perpich.

After a disappointing season in 1989–90 Bob Mancini replaced Perpich but Daniels was retained as an assistant. The first season under the new coach saw the Bulldogs post their first 20-win season in a decade but then slipped back under .500 in 1991–92. Mancini left to take over at Michigan Tech, leaving the door open for Daniels to take the reins.

In his first season leading the team Daniels got the Bulldogs to another 20-win campaign, but it would be six more years before he could provide the Ferris State faithful win another winning season. Daniels' continued on in his position despite the lack of consistent success and rewarded the Bulldogs with their first 30-win season in 2002–03. Ferris State won its first regular season conference title that year and fell one game short of its first conference tournament championship, falling to Michigan 5–3 in the final. With their superb record, Ferris State received an at-large bid to the 2003 NCAA Tournament, their first appearance in the championship, and downed perennial power North Dakota in the regional semifinal before being eliminated. Daniels coached his first Hobey Baker Award finalist in 2003 and while Chris Kunitz failed to capture the award, Daniels himself received both the CCHA Coach of the Year and Spencer Penrose Award.

Over the course of the next decade the Bulldogs hovered around the .500 mark until 2011–12 when Daniels got Ferris State its second regular season title, and NCAA Tournament appearance. The 2012 Tournament saw a better result for the team as they won each of their first three games while allowing only 1 goal in each game. They could not stop the #1 overall seed Boston College Eagles from taking the crown, losing 4–1 in the championship game. The season did finish with a silver lining as Daniels received his second CCHA Coach of the Year and Spencer Penrose Awards.

The following season was Ferris State's last in the CCHA when the conference dissolved after the realignment resulting from the formation of the Big Ten. They joined the WCHA beginning in 2013–14 and got off to a fast start, winning the regular season title with a 29-win year and making their third NCAA berth, losing a double overtime game to North Dakota in the regional finals. For his efforts Daniels was awarded the WCHA Coach of the Year Award.

Head coaching record

See also
List of college men's ice hockey coaches with 400 wins

References

External links

Ferris State bio

1959 births
Living people
American ice hockey coaches
Ferris State Bulldogs men's ice hockey coaches
Michigan State Spartans men's ice hockey players
American men's ice hockey forwards